Group A of the 2019 AFC Asian Cup took place from 5 to 14 January 2019. The group consisted of tournament hosts United Arab Emirates, Thailand, India and Bahrain. The top two teams, the United Arab Emirates and Thailand, along with third-placed Bahrain (as one of the four best third-placed teams), advanced to the round of 16.

Teams

Notes

Standings

In the round of 16:
 The winners of Group A, the United Arab Emirates, advanced to play the third-placed team of Group C, Kyrgyzstan.
 The runners-up of Group A, Thailand, advanced to play the runners-up of Group C, China PR.
 The third-placed team of Group A, Bahrain, advanced to play the winners of Group C, South Korea (as one of the four best third-placed teams).

Matches
All times listed are GST (UTC+4).

United Arab Emirates vs Bahrain
With six minutes played, Ali Mabkhout found Ismail Al Hammadi, who fired narrowly wide of Bahrain goalkeeper Sayed Shubbar Alawi’s far post. Mabkhout shot over the bar from 15 yards after an Ali Salmeen cross on 23 minutes. In the final moments of the first half, Kamil Al Aswad's free kick from 25 yards narrowly whizzed over the bar. Khalid Eisa then made a double save to deny Bahrain in the 52nd minute by first palming away Ali Madan’s drive and blocking Mohamed Al Romaihi’s subsequent follow-up. Eight minutes after the hour mark, Bahrain failed to clear the lines at a corner and the ball was eventually deflected into the path of Mabkhout, who shot just wide of the post. On 78 minutes, defender Sayed Redha Isa crossed to Al Romaihi, who saw his initial header cleared off the line before ramming home the rebound. Bahraini substitute Mohamed Marhoon, who had only just come on, handled the ball in the area on 88 minutes and Ahmed Khalil, having come off the bench for his 100th cap, scored the resulting penalty to ensure his side a point.

Thailand vs India
 
Thailand threatened first with captain Teerasil Dangda finding Thitipan Puangchan, firing an 11th minute drive which sailed narrowly wide of Indian goalkeeper Gurpreet Singh Sandhu’s right-hand post. Later on, Ashique Kuruniyan’s shot was saved by Chatchai Budprom, only for defender Theerathon Bunmathan to concede a penalty when he handled the subsequent rebound. Sunil Chhetri converted the resulting penalty to give India the lead in the 27th minute. Thailand were, however, to draw level just six minutes later, with Teerasil heading home Theerathon’s delivered set-piece. Moments after the restart, Kuruniyan and Udanta Singh combined to set up Chhetri who fired home past Chatchai from 15 yards to restore his side’s advantage. In the 68th minute Udanta charged towards the goal before laying the ball back to Anirudh Thapa, who dinked the ball past both Chatchai and a recovering defender into the back of the net. With time running out, Thailand rallied briefly when Teerasil saw a goal-bound effort diverted to safety via the outstretched leg of the defender Anas Edathodika. With 10 minutes remaining, substitute Jeje Lalpekhlua scored a curling strike from the edge of the area.

This became India's biggest ever win in their Asian Cup history, while it was also India's first ever win after 55 years. This hammered defeat to India prompted the FAT to sack Milovan Rajevac and appointed Sirisak Yodyardthai as interim coach. The two goals helped Sunil Chhetri overtake Lionel Messi to become the second-highest active goalscorer in men's international football, behind Cristiano Ronaldo.

Bahrain vs Thailand
Thailand came close to opening the scoring in the 20th minute when captain Teerasil Dangda's effort was blocked by Bahraini goalkeeper Sayed Shubbar Alawi. Eight minutes later, Bahrain forced Thai goalkeeper Siwarak Tedsungnoen to pull off a double save against Mohamed Marhoon and Sayed Dhiya Saeed. Four minutes from the end of the half, Mohamed Al Romaihi failed to keep his header down from Marhoon's cross. In the 58th minute, Tristan Do sent a cross into the Bahrain penalty box. The ball was deflected by Ahmed Juma but a surging Chanathip Songkrasin sent a left-footed shot past Alawi to give Thailand the advantage. Thailand came close to doubling their lead when Chanathip's pass found Adisak Kraisorn but his effort was denied by the upright in the 71st minute.

India vs United Arab Emirates
India had the game's first chance when Ashique Kuruniyan dashed into the area before unleashing a drive which forced goalkeeper Khalid Eisa into a fine save on 11 minutes. Eisa was called into action once again in the 23rd minute, this time reacting to repel a Sunil Chhetri header. Five minutes before half-time, Anas Edathodika made a mess of it and allowed Ali Mabkhout to set up Khalfan Mubarak to fire home past Indian custodian Gurpreet Singh Sandhu. In the final moments of the first period, Chhetri came within inches of drawing his side level, but his effort fizzed just wide of Eisa's far post. After the break, substitute Jeje Lalpekhlua fired a shot narrowly off target and then Udanta Singh rattled the Emirati bar with a drive from a narrow angle. Ismail Al Hammadi’s 74th-minute shot cannoned off the post and then Sandhu before rebounding to safety. The UAE doubled their advantage in the final moments when Mabkhout converted Ali Salmeen’s pass to secure the victory despite Mohamed Ahmed crashing the ball against his own woodwork deep into stoppage time.

United Arab Emirates vs Thailand
The United Arab Emirates and Thailand both booked their places in the knockout stage as a 1–1 draw at the Hazza bin Zayed Stadium was enough to ensure both nations progressed. Ali Mabkhout put Alberto Zaccheroni's side ahead after seven minutes but Thitipan Puangchan struck four minutes from time to earn the Thais a point that sees them take second place in Group A, following India's late loss to Bahrain, thanks to a better head-to-head record.

The hosts made the perfect start when, with many in the crowd of almost 18,000 still finding their seats, they found the back of Siwarak Tedsungnoen's goal. Ismail Al Hammadi burst into the area and attempted to clip the ball over the Thai keeper, only for it to come back off the crossbar. However, Mabkhout rose to head home the rebound from inside the six-yard box. Khalfan Mubarak sought to double the lead 11 minutes later when he twisted his way past the Thai defence, only to send a weak shot trundling through to Siwarak.

While the UAE have qualified for the knockout phase for the second tournament in a row, Thailand will be featuring in the next round for the first time since they reached the semi-finals in 1972.

India vs Bahrain
Jamal Rashid's penalty in stoppage time sealed the 1–0 win for Bahrain over India, taking them into the knockout stage for the first time since 2004. With the UAE and Thailand playing to a 1–1 draw, Bahrain finished third in Group A with four points, confirming them as one of the best four third-placed teams that will advance to the Round of 16.

India suffered early problems at the back when Anas Edathodika was forced off with an injury in the fourth minute and replaced with Salam Ranjan Singh. Bahrain then applied pressure on the Blue Tigers' defence as goalkeeper Gurpreet Singh Sandhu was called into action three minutes later to save Sayed Dhiya Saeed's left footed shot from outside the box. India were able to calm their nerves and responded in the 20th minute. Sunil Chhetri came close to scoring, but the striker failed to steer Gurpreet's long pass home. In the last minutes, Rashid and Saeed both failed to find the mark with long-range efforts, before the former scored a penalty that won Bahrain the match.

Discipline
Fair play points were used as tiebreakers if the head-to-head and overall records of teams were tied (and if a penalty shoot-out was not applicable as a tiebreaker). These were calculated based on yellow and red cards received in all group matches as follows:
yellow card = 1 point
red card as a result of two yellow cards = 3 points
direct red card = 3 points
yellow card followed by direct red card = 4 points

Only one of the above deductions was applied to a player in a single match.

Notes

References

External links
 

Group A
2018–19 in Emirati football
2019 in Thai football
2018–19 in Bahraini football
2018–19 in Indian football